Agathia is a genus of moths in the family Geometridae described by Achille Guenée in 1858.

Description
Palpi with second joint upturned and reaching vertex of head, and third joint porrect (extending forward), which is short in male and long in female. Antennae almost simple. Hind tibia of male dilated with a fold containing a tuft of long hair and ending in a short process on upperside. Abdomen with dorsal tufts. Forewings with vein 3 from angle of cell. Veins 7, 8, 9 and 10 stalked and vein 11 free. Hindwings with vein 3 from angle of cell. Veins 6 and 7 from upper angle and vein 8 approximating to vein 7 to near middle of cell. The outer margin produced to a point at vein 4.

Species

 Agathia affluens Prout, 1937
 Agathia arcuata Moore, [1868]
 Agathia carissima Butler, 1878
 Agathia codina Swinhoe, 1892
 Agathia conviridaria Hübner, 1823
 Agathia cristifera (Walker, 1861)
 Agathia deliciosa Holloway & Sommerer, 1984
 Agathia diplochorda Prout, 1916
 Agathia distributa Lucas, 1891
 Agathia diversiformis Warren, 1894
 Agathia eromenoides Holloway, 1996
 Agathia gigantea Butler, 1880
 Agathia hemithearia Guenee, 1857
 Agathia kuehni Warren, 1898
 Agathia laetata (Fabricius, 1794)
 Agathia laqueifera Prout, 1912
 Agathia largita Holloway, 1996
 Agathia lycaenaria (Kollar, 1848)
 Agathia magnifica Moore, 1879
 Agathia magnificentia Inoue, 1978
 Agathia muluensis Holloway, 1996
 Agathia obsoleta Warren, 1897
 Agathia ochrotypa Turner, 1922
 Agathia pisina Butler, 1887
 Agathia prasinaspis Meyrick, 1889
 Agathia quinaria Moore, [1868]
 Agathia rubrilineata Warren, 1896
 Agathia solaria Swinhoe, 1905
 Agathia succedanea Warren, 1897
 Agathia vicina (Bastelberger, 1911)
 Agathia visenda Prout, 1917

References

 

Geometrinae
Geometridae genera